Damburneya longipetiolata is a species of plant in the family Lauraceae. It is endemic to Costa Rica.

References

longipetiolata
Endemic flora of Costa Rica
Endangered flora of North America
Taxonomy articles created by Polbot